Kelly James Clark (born March 3, 1956) is an American philosopher noted for his work in the philosophy of religion, science and religion, and the cognitive science of religion. He is currently Senior Research Fellow at the Kaufman Interfaith Institute and Professor at Grand Valley State University in Grand Rapids Michigan.

Biography 

Clark received his PhD from the University of Notre Dame, where his dissertation advisor was Alvin Plantinga. He has held professorships at Calvin College, Oxford University, University of St. Andrews, Notre Dame & Gordon College. He also served as Executive Director for the Society of Christian Philosophers from 1994 to 2009.

Clark's books include God and the Brain, Strangers, Neighbors, Friends, Religion and the Sciences of Origins, Abraham’s Children, Return to Reason, The Story of Ethics, When Faith Is Not Enough, and 101 Key Philosophical Terms of Their Importance for Theology, many of which have been translated into multiple languages. In 1995, his book Philosophers Who Believe was named one of Christianity Today’s Books of the Year. That book detailed the spiritual and intellectual autobiographies of philosophers such as Alvin Plantinga, Nicholas Wolterstorff, Basil Mitchell, Mortimer Adler, Richard Swinburne, Frederick Suppe, Linda Zagzebski, and Nicholas Rescher.

Interfaith work 
Clark is an international advocate for interfaith cooperation, focusing on the Abrahamic religions. As of October 2016, he is project director for “Abrahamic Reflections on Science and Religion” a Templeton Foundation project which brings together 36 scholars from 14 countries to reconcile issues in the fields of science and religion. Scholars include Nidhal Guessoum, Rana Dajani, Nathan Aviezer, & Robert Koons, among others.

Clark has lectured around the world and has served as director for international conferences on science and religion, interfaith cooperation, & Chinese philosophy. He has worked extensively with the John Templeton Foundation, organizing many interfaith symposiums, notably “Liberty and Tolerance in an Age of Religious Conflict” at Georgetown University on the 10th anniversary of 9/11. That conference inspired a book of the same name in which fifteen influential practitioners of the Abrahamic religions argued for religious liberty and tolerance from their own faith traditions. Contributors included former United States president Jimmy Carter, Indonesia's first democratically elected president Abhurrahman Wahid, Rabbis for Human Rights co founder, Rabbi Arik Asherman, Rana Husseini, Nurit Peled-Elhanan, the philosopher Nicholas Wolterstorff & theologian Miroslav Volf. The book earned praise from pioneers for peace such as Bishop Desmond Tutu.

He also writes a regular column for the Huffington Post which confronts Islamophobia and antisemitism while also combating religious extremism.

Selected books 
 God and the Brain. Eerdmans, 2019
Strangers, Neighbors, Friends. Cascade Books, 2018. Co-written with Aziz Abu Sarah and Rabbi Nancy Kreimer.
Readings in the Philosophy of Religion. Broadview Press, 2017.
 The Blackwell Companion to Naturalism. Wiley-Blackwell, 2016. 
 Religion and the Sciences of Origins. Palgrave Macmillan; 2014. 
 Abraham’s Children: Liberty and Tolerance in an age of Religious Conflict. Yale University Press, 2012 
 Reason, Metaphysics, and Mind: New Essays on the Philosophy of Alvin Plantinga, Oxford University Press, 2012. Co-edited with Michael Rea. 
 Evidence and Religious Belief. Oxford University Press, 2011. Co-edited with Ray VanArragon.
 Faith, Knowledge and Naturalism, Peking University Press, 2007. Co-edited with Xing Taotao.
 Ethics, Religion and Society (Christian Academics, Fifth Volume). Co-edited with Zhang Qingxiong and Xu Yi Yie. Shanghai Guji Press, 2007.
 Human Nature in Chinese and Western Culture, co-edited with Chen Xia. Sichuan University Press, 2005.
 101 Key Philosophical Terms and Their Importance for Theology. Westminster/John Knox Press, 2004. Co-authored with James K.A. Smith and Richard Lints.
 A Dialogue Between Science and Religion, co-edited with Mel Stewart and Zhou Zhianzang. Xiamen University Press, 2004.
 The Story of Ethics: Human Nature & Human Fulfillment. Prentice-Hall, 2003.  Co-authored with Anne Poortenga.
 Five Views on Apologetics. Zondervan Publishing Company, 2000.  Co-authored with William Lane Craig, Gary Habermas, John Frame and Paul Feinberg.
 When Faith Is Not Enough. Eerdmans Publishing Company, 1997. 
 Philosophers Who Believe. InterVarsity Press, 1993.
 Return to Reason. Eerdmans Publishing Company, 1990. 
 Our Knowledge of God: Essays on Natural and Philosophical Theology. Kluwer academic publishers, 1992.

References

External links
 Academia.edu profile
 Academia.edu CV
 GVSU information page

20th-century American philosophers
Grand Valley State University faculty
1956 births
Living people
21st-century American philosophers
University of Notre Dame alumni